A Casa Assassinada (English: The Murdered House) is a 1971 Brazilian drama film directed by Paulo Cesar Saraceni, based on Lúcio Cardoso's book Chronicle of the Murdered House.

Cast 
Norma Bengell.... Nina
Carlos Kroeber.... Timóteo
Nelson Dantas
Leina Krespi
Tetê Medina
Augusto Rodrigues Lourenço
Nuno Veloso
Rubens de Araújo ...Valdo
Joseph Guerreiro

Awards 
1971: Festival de Brasília
Best Film (won)
Best Director (Paulo César Saraceni) (won) 
Best Actor (Carlos Kroeber) (won)
Best Editing (Mário Carneiro) (won) 
Best Music (Antonio Carlos Jobim) (won)

1973: Gramado Film Festival
Best Actor (Carlos Kroeber) (won) 
Best Music (Antonio Carlos Jobim) (won)
Best Picture (Nominee)

1973: São Paulo Association of Art Critics Awards 
Best Actor (Carlos Kroeber) (won) 
Best Actress (Norma Bengell) (won) 
Best Supporting Actress (Tetê Medina) (won) 
Best Director (Paulo César Saraceni) (won) 
Best Cinematography (Mário Carneiro) (won)

References

External links 
 

1971 films
1970s Portuguese-language films
Brazilian drama films
Films scored by Antônio Carlos Jobim
1971 drama films